The Yilba, also written Ilba and Jilba, are or were an Aboriginal Australian people of the present-day state of Queensland.

Country
Their northern boundaries lay roughly about Pentland Hills and Seventy Mile Range. Their eastern extension was around the Suttor River, while their southern limits were at Lake Buchanan. The Yilba were indigenous to places like on Campaspe River; and the Natal Downs.

Language

The Yilba language (and variant names as per the people) is extinct , with no speakers recorded since before 1975. It is regarded as a dialect of Biri.

Social organisation
The Yilba were composed of kin groups of which six at least are known:
 Yukkaburra
 Wokkulburra (eel people)
 Pegulloburra
 Mungooburra
 Mungullaburra (spinifex people)
 Goondoolooburra (emu people)

While stating that there are six "hordes", Tindale gave the names of only three, two of which differ from the list in one of his primary sources on the six, namely
 Moothaburra
 Mungera;

he also adds a possible fourth group:
 Muqkibara.

Alternative names
 Yukkaburra, Yuckaburra
 Munkeeburra
 Moothaburra (horde name )
 Mungera, Mungerra {horde name )
 Eneby (language name)
 Pagulloburra, Pegulloburra (horde name)

Notes

Citations

Sources

Aboriginal peoples of Queensland